Eric Clifford Drysdale (born 26 May 1941) is a South African former tennis player. After a career as a highly ranked professional player in the 1960s and early 1970s, he became a well-known tennis announcer.

Drysdale won the singles title at the Dutch Open in Hilversum in 1963 and 1964. In 1965, he reached the singles final of the 1965 U. S. Championships and he won the singles title at the German Championships. He defeated Rod Laver in the fourth round of the first US Open in 1968. During his Open-era career, Drysdale captured five singles titles and six doubles titles, including the 1972 US Open doubles crown with Roger Taylor. He was a pioneer of the two-handed backhand shot, which he used to great effect during his playing career.

Drysdale was included among the Handsome Eight, a group of players signed by Lamar Hunt in 1968 for the newly formed professional World Championship Tennis group. He became president of the Association of Tennis Professionals (ATP), an association that Drysdale had formed in 1972 with Jack Kramer and Donald Dell.

Following retirement, Drysdale became a naturalized American citizen. He is the cofounder of Cliff Drysdale Tennis, which specializes in resort, hotel and club-tennis management.

Drysdale has served as a tennis commentator for ESPN since the network's inception in 1979.

In 1998, the USTA awarded Drysdale the William M. Johnston award for his contribution to men's tennis. In 2013, he was elected into the International Tennis Hall of Fame.

Grand Slam finals

Singles: 1 (1 runner-up)

Doubles: 1 (1 title)

Grand Prix Championship Series finals

Singles: 2 (2 runner-ups)

Open Era finals

Singles (5 titles)

Grand Slam singles performance timeline

Note: The Australian Open was held twice in 1977, in January and December.

References

External links

 
 
 

 Biography and images of Cliff on the Cliff Drysdale site
Red Ledges Cliff Drysdale Tennis Academy in Utah
ESPN's Cliff Drysdale to emcee "Legends Ball"
Cliff Drysdale ESPN Bio

1941 births
Living people
People from Mbombela

Sportspeople from Miami
South African emigrants to the United States
South African male tennis players
Tennis commentators
Tennis people from Florida
Tennis players from Miami
Tennis people from Texas
Grand Slam (tennis) champions in men's doubles
International Tennis Hall of Fame inductees
Naturalized citizens of the United States
Alumni of Grey High School
US Open (tennis) champions